Mithatpaşa is a Turkish name, and may refer to

 Mithat Pasha, Ottoman Pasha
 Mithatpaşa Avenue, Ankara
 Mithatpasa railway station, Sakarya Province 
 Mithatpaşa Stadium, former name of BJK İnönü Stadium, İstanbul